Ischnoptera bilunata is a species of cockroach in the family Ectobiidae. It is found in North America and South America.

References

Cockroaches
Articles created by Qbugbot
Insects described in 1869